The Zeravshan is a river in Tajikistan and Uzbekistan, Central Asia. Its name, "spreader of gold" in Persian, refers to the presence of gold-bearing sands in the upper reaches of the river. To the ancient Greeks it was known as the Polytimetus. It was also formerly known as  Sughd River.

Geographic position
It rises at the Zeravshan Glacier, close to where the Turkestan Range and the Zeravshan Range of the Pamir-Alay mountains meet, in Tajikistan. In its upper course, upstream from its confluence with the Fan Darya, it is also called Matcha.

Related news
Tajikistan aims to construct several hydro-electric power stations on Zerafshan River and has signed the MOU in November 2013 with Zarvon Corporation for the financing and construction of the plants. All previous MOU's have been voided.

See also
Zarafshon, a city in Uzbekistan's Navoiy Region, called "the gold capital of Uzbekistan".
Zarafshan (disambiguation)

Notes

References

Further reading

 В.В. Бартольд "К Истории Орошения в Туркестане" (Collected Works, Vol.3) (Москва) 1965
 V.V. Barthold "Turkestan Down to the Mongol Invasion" (London) 1968
 Robert Lewis "Early Irrigation in West Turkestan" Annals of the Association of American Geographers Vol.56 No..3 (Sept. 1966) pp467–491 
 Edgar Knobloch "Beyond the Oxus" (London) 1972

Rivers of Tajikistan
Rivers of Uzbekistan
International rivers of Asia
Persian words and phrases